is a Michelin 2-star kaiseki restaurant in Ginza, Chūō, Tokyo, Japan. It is owned and operated by chef Toru Okuda. It is a personal favorite of chef, David Kinch.

See also
 List of Japanese restaurants
 List of Michelin three starred restaurants

References

External links
 

Ginza
Tourist attractions in Tokyo
Restaurants in Tokyo
Sushi restaurants in Japan
Michelin Guide starred restaurants in Japan